The Adventures of Frank Merriwell (1936) is a Universal movie serial based on the Frank Merriwell books by Gilbert Patten.

Plot
College sports hero Frank Meriwell leaves school before an impending decisive baseball game to track down his missing father and locate a fabulous lost treasure.

Cast
Don Briggs as Frank Merriwell
Jean Rogers as Elsie Belwood
John King as Bruce Browning
Bentley Hewett as Daggett
House Peters Jr. as House Peters
Carla Laemmle as Carla
Sumner Getchell as Harry
Wallace Reid Jr. as Wally
Herschel Mayall Jr. as Herschel
Al Bridge as Henchman Black
Dick Wessell as Henchman Joe
Bud Osborne as Henchman Gorman
Ed Cobb as Henchman Pete
Sam McDaniel as Servant Jeff
Walter Law as Mr. Belwood
Ella Ethridge as Mrs. Merriwell
William P. Carlton as Mr. Merriwell

Production
The Adventures of Frank Merriwell is set in 1936 instead of the 1890s of the source material.
 
Universal combined several stories by Burt Standish to make this film.

Chapter titles
 College Hero
 The Death Plunge
 Death at the Crossroads
 Wreck of the Viking
 Capsized in the Cataract
 Descending Doom
 Monster of the Deep
 The Tragic Victory
 Between Savage Foes
 Imprisoned in a Dungeon
 The Crash in the Chasm
 The Winning Play
Source:

See also
 List of American films of 1936
 List of film serials by year
 List of film serials by studio

References

External links

 

1936 films
1936 adventure films
American black-and-white films
1930s English-language films
Films based on American novels
Universal Pictures film serials
Films directed by Lew Landers
Films set in 1936
American adventure films
Films with screenplays by George H. Plympton
Films about missing people
1930s American films